Gullion is a surname. Notable people with the surname include:
Allen W. Gullion (1880–1946), American Army officer
Blair Gullion (1901–1959), American basketball player
Edmund A. Gullion (1913–1998), American diplomat
Tom Gullion (born 1965), American jazz saxophonist

See also 
Lough Gullion, is a lake in Northern Ireland
Ring of Gullion, is a geological formation and area in County Armagh, Northern Ireland
Slieve Gullion, is a mountain in the south of County Armagh, Northern Ireland